The 1975 Cal Poly Pomona Broncos football team represented California State Polytechnic University, Pomona as a member of the California Collegiate Athletic Association (CCAA) during the 1975 NCAA Division II football season. Led by second-year head coach Andy Vinci, Cal Poly Pomona compiled an overall record of 6–4–1 with a mark of 2–2 in conference play, placing third in the CCAA. The team outscored its opponents 256 to 199 for the season. The Broncos played home games at Kellogg Field in Pomona, California.

Schedule

Team players in the NFL
No Cal Poly Pomona players were selected in the 1976 NFL Draft.

The following player finished their Cal Poly Pomona career in 1975, were not drafted, but played in the NFL.

References

Cal Poly Pomona
Cal Poly Pomona Broncos football seasons
Cal Poly Pomona Broncos football